Faisal bin Turki Al Saud ( Fayṣal ibn Turkī Āl Suʿūd; 1785 – December 1865) was the second ruler of the Second Saudi State and seventh head of the House of Saud.

Early life
Faisal was the son of Imam Turki bin Abdullah. He was one of the members of the Al Saud family who was taken to Cairo following the capture of Diriyah by Ibrahim Pasha, son of Muhammad Ali, in May 1819. Faisal returned to Riyadh in 1827-1828.

In 1830 Faisal was sent on military operations to Al Hasa in the east. But his father was assassinated by Mishari bin Abdul Rahman, a second-cousin of his father in 1834. Faisal hurried back to Riyadh to deal with the revolt. His troops stormed the castle and killed Mishari. Emir of Jabal Shammar, Abdullah bin Rashid, helped Faisal in this attack. Those not directly involved in the murder were spared and the town pledged allegiance.

Reign
Imam Faisal first ruled the Second Saudi State from 1834 to 1838. Then he was forced into exile in Cairo by the Ottomans who sent an expedition to Najd due to his rejection of paying tribute to the Egyptian forces in Hejaz.

Faisal continued to oppose the Ottoman forces, however, and the Egyptian governor of Arabia, Khurshid Pasha, supported a rival candidate - Khalid bin Saud, a second-cousin of Faisal. Khalid was a member of the senior line of the Saud family. Faisal was forced to flee the city and take refuge with the al Khorayef princes of the Bani Tamim tribes. In December 1838, he attempted to come to terms with Khurshid Pasha, but was forced to return to captivity a second time in Cairo. He was accompanied by his younger brother Jiluwi, his sons, Abdullah and Muhammad, and his cousin, Abdullah bin Ibrahim bin Abdullah, a son of his uncle. In 1843, he was released in Cairo and returned to Riyadh following the total withdrawal of the remaining Egyptian troops from Najd in 1841.

Following his return to Riyadh Faisal reclaimed the throne in 1843 and ruled until 1865. He easily defeated his third-cousin Abdullah bin Thunayan, who had revolted against the ineffective Khalid and taken control. Faisal depended on a close alliance with the Al Rashid family of Ha'il. Abdullah bin Rashid played a key role in his success, and the two families were extensively intermarried. In return, Faisal appointed Abdullah as the Amir of Ha'il in 1835. In his second term Faisal also established cordial relations with the Ottomans who appointed him governor of Najd. In turn, Faisal recognised the supremacy of the Ottoman Empire in the region.

Faisal formally requested the support of the British Political Resident in Bushire through his representative in Trucial Oman in 1848. In 1851 he also demanded the assistance of the British Political Resident to collect zakat from Bahraini Muslims. Following unsuccessful attempts to gain authority in Al Qassim Faisal appointed his younger brother Jiluwi governor to the region. However, Jiluwi did not manage to obtain full loyalty of people there who revolted against him 1854. During the 1850s Faisal unsuccessfully attempted to capture Oman and Bahrain. His next target was the Trucial States which he attacked in the 1860s. His both attempts were not fruitful, and the British forces militarily stopped his attacks. In 1865 a colonel in the British army, Lewis Pelly, officially visited Faisal in Riyadh.

Faisal's major income sources included zakat, import duties, pilgrim fees, one-fifth share from raids and warfare, fines, revenues from the ruler’s personal domains, and tributes paid by neighbouring countries such as Bahrain and Muscat. He governed the Emirate with success until his death in December 1865. However, around the end of his rule the de facto ruler of the Emirate was his heir and son, Abdullah, and infighting among his four sons eventually destroyed the state.

Personal life and death
Faisal bin Turki had four sons, Abdullah, Saud, Muhammad and Abdul Rahman. Of them Abdullah and Muhammad were full brothers so were Saud and Abdul Rahman. The mother of Abdullah and Muhammad was from the Al Saud whereas the mother of Saud and Abdul Rahman was from the Ajman tribe. One of his daughters married Rashidi Emir, Abdullah bin Rashid. Another, Tarfa, married Nasser Al Saud who was a great great grandson of Farhan bin Saud.

Faisal became very frail and blind during the later years. He died following a prolonged illness in Riyadh in December 1865 and was succeeded by his son Abdullah.

References

For further reading
 Second State of Saudi Arabia

19th-century monarchs in the Middle East
1785 births
1865 deaths
Faisal
Faisal
Faisal